Saguna may refer to:
 Saguna brahman, a Brahman absolute with qualities
 Saguna Baug, an agritourism centre in Neral, Raigarh, Maharashtra, India
 Saguna, Nadia, a census town in West Bengal, India